The following is a list of all the musical compositions of Charles-Valentin Alkan in order of opus number. Transcriptions are excluded from this list. All dates are publication dates except for unpublished works:

With opus numbers
 Op. 1, Variations on a theme from Steibelt's Orage concerto in E major (1828)
 Op. 2, Les omnibus, variations in C major (1829)
 Op. 3, Rondoletto Il était un p'tit homme in A major (1833)
 Op. 4, Rondo brillant in A major (1833)
 Op. 5, Largo al factotum, air du Barbier de Séville arrangé en rondo brillant (1833, lost)
 Op. 8  See 12 morceaux caractéristiques in 'Without opus numbers' below.
 Op. 10, Two Concerti da camera (1832–1837?)
 No. 1 Concerto da Camera in A minor (1832)
 Allegro moderato in A minor; Adagio in E major; Rondo: Allegro in A major
 No. 2 Concerto da Camera in C minor (1834)
 Allegro moderato in C minor; Adagio in A major; 1re movimento in C major
 No. 3 Concerto da Camera in C major (1837) (= orchestral version of Op. 13 No. 2. Orchestral parts lost, reconstructed by Hugh Mcdonald)
 Op. 12, Rondeau Chromatique in B minor (1834)
 Opp. 12, 13, 15 and 16 (nos. 1-3) below were published as 12 caprices en 4 livres (4 Livres d'Études-Caprices) (1837):
 Op. 12 (duplicated opus number), Trois improvisations dans le style brilliant (1837)
 No. 1 Prestissimo in E major; No. 2 Allegretto in D major; No. 3 Allegro marziale in B minor
 Op. 13, Trois andantes romantiques (1837)
 No. 1 Andante in B major; No. 2 Andante con moto in C major (= solo piano version of Op. 10 No. 3); No. 3 Andante in G major
 Op. 15, Souvenirs. Trois morceaux dans le genre pathétique (1837)
 No. 1 Aime-moi in A minor; No. 2 Le vent in B minor; No. 3 Morte in E minor
 Op. 16, Trois études de bravoure, Tre scherzi ou Caprices (Nos. 1–3) (1837)
 No. 1 Mouvement de valse in C major; No. 2 Moderato (quasi Minuetto) in C minor; No. 3 Prestissimo in B minor
 Op. 16 no. 4 Variations sur "Ah! segnata é la mia morte" in D major (1834)
 Op. 16 no. 5 Variations sur un thème de Bellini "La tremenda ultrice spada" in G major (1834)
 Op. 16 no. 6 Variations quasi-fantaisie sur une barcarolle napolitiane in B major (1834)
 Op. 16 (duplicate opus number) - See 12 morceaux caractéristiques in 'Without opus numbers' below.
 Op. 17, Le preux, étude de concert in B major (1844), See also below 'Works without opus numbers - Piano 4 hands', Finale (duplicate opus number)
 Op. 21, Grand duo concertant in F minor for violin and pianoforte (1842)
 Assez anime in F minor; L'enfer (Lentement) ("Hell") in C major; Aussi vite que possible in F major
 Op. 22, Premier Nocturne in B major (1844)
 Op. 23, Saltarelle in E minor (1844)
 Op. 24, Gigue et air de ballet dans le style ancien (1844)
 Presto in A minor
 Modéré in D minor
 Op. 25, Alleluia in F major (1844)
 Op. 26, Marche funèbre in E minor (1846).  See also below 'Works without opus numbers - Piano 4 hands', Fantaisie à 4 mains sur Don Juan (duplicate opus number)
 Op. 27, Marche triomphale in B major (1846)
 Op. 27, Le chemin de fer in D minor (1844) (duplicate opus number)
 Op. 29, Bourrée d'Auvergne in C minor (1846)
 Op. 30, Premier Trio pour Piano, Violon, et Basse in G minor (1841)
 Assez largement in G minor; Très vite in G minor; Lentement in G major; Vite in G minor
 Op. 31, 25 Préludes dans tous les tons majeurs et mineurs pour le piano ou orgue (1847)

 Op. 32 no. 1, 1er recueil d'impromptus (1845–1848, published 1848).
 No. 1 Vaghezza in B major (1847); No. 2 L'amitié in B major (1845); No. 3 Fantasietta alla moresca in G major (1847); No. 4 La foi in B major (1848?).
 Op. 32 no. 2, 3 Airs à cinq temps et 1 air à sept temps, 2e. Recueil d'Impromptus (1849)
 No. 1 Andantino in A minor; No. 2 Mesto, allegretto in D minor; No. 3 Vivace in F major; No. 4 Andante flebile in A minor.
 Op. 33, Grande sonate 'Les quatre âges' (1848)
 20 ans in B minor; 30 ans: Quasi-Faust in D minor; 40 ans: Un heureux ménage in G major; 50 ans: Prométhée enchaîne in G minor
 Op. 34, Scherzo-focoso in B minor (1848)
 Op. 35, Douze études dans tous les tons majeurs (1848)

 Op. 37, Trois marches quasi da cavalleria (1857)
 No. 1 Molto Allegro in A minor; No. 2 Allegro vivace in A minor; No. 3 Allegro - Più Presto in C minor
 Op. 38a, Premier recueil de chants (1857)

 Op. 38b, Deuxième recueil de chants (1857)

 Op. 39, Douze études dans tous les tons mineurs (1857)

 Op. 40, 3 marches for piano 4 hands (1857)
 No. 1 Allegro in A major; No. 2 Allegro moderato in E major; No. 3 Modérément in B major
 Op. 41, Trois petites fantaisies (1857)
 No. 1 Assez gravement in A minor; No. 2 Andantino in G major; No. 3 Presto in B major
 Op. 42, Réconciliation - petit caprice mi-partie en forme de zorcico, ou Air de Danse Basque à cinq temps in C major (1857)
 Op. 45, Salut, cendre de pauvre!, paraphrase (texte de Legouvé) in B major (1856)
 Op. 46, Minuetto alla tedesca in A minor (1857)
 Op. 47, Sonate de concert in E major for cello and pianoforte (1857); viola and piano transcription by Casimir Ney
 Allegro molto in E major; Allegrettino in A major; Adagio in C major; Finale alla Saltarella in E minor
 Op. 50, Capriccio alla soldatesca in A minor (1859)
 Op. 50 bis, Le tambour bat aux champs, esquisse pour piano in B minor (1859)
 Op. 51, Trois menuets (1859)
 No. 1 Tempo giusto in E major; No. 2 Tempo debole in G minor; No. 3 Tempo nobile in G major
 Op. 52, Super flumina Babylonis, paraphrase du psaume 137 in G minor (1859)
 Op. 53, Quasi-caccia in A major (1859)
 Op. 54, Benedictus for pedal piano in D minor (1859)
 Op. 55, Une fusée, Introduction et impromptu in D minor (1859)
 Op. 57, 2e.et 3e. Nocturnes (1859)
 No. 1 Deuxième Nocturne in B minor; No. 2 Troisième Nocturne in F major
 Op. 60, Deux petites pièces pour piano (1859)
 No. 1 Ma chère liberté in F major; No. 2 Ma chère servitude in A minor
 Op. 60bis, Le grillon (Quatrième Nocturne) in B major (1859)
 Op. 61, Sonatine pour piano in A minor (1861)
 Allegro vivace in A minor; Allegramente in F major; Scherzo-Minuetto in D minor; Tempo giusto in A minor
 Op. 63, 48 Motifs (Esquisses) (1861). Despite the title given by the composer, there are in fact 49 pieces in the collection.

 Op. 64, 13 prières for organ or pedal piano (1866)

 Op. 65, Troisième recueil de chants (1866)

 Op. 66, 11 grands préludes et un transcription du Messie de Hændel for organ, harmonium or pedal piano (1865)

 Op. 67, Quatrième recueil de chants (1868)

 Op. 69, Impromptu sur le choral de Luther "Un fort rempart est notre Dieu" for pedal piano in E major (1866)
 Op. 70, Cinquième recueil de chants (1872)

 Op. 72, 11 pièces dans le style religieux, et un transcription du Messie de Hændel for organ, harmonium or pedal piano (1867)

 Op. 74, Les Mois (1838)  - See 12 morceaux caractéristiques in 'Without opus numbers' below.
 Op. 75, Toccatina in C minor (1872)
 Op. 76, Trois grandes études for piano (1839). Originally published without opus number.
 No. 1 Fantaisie in A major for the left hand; No. 2 Introduction, Variations et Finale in D major for the right hand; No. 3  (Rondo-Toccata) in C minor for hands reunited

Without opus numbers

Piano solo
12 morceaux caractéristiques (c. 1838). Nos. 1, 4, 5, 7, 8, and 12 subsequently published as 6 morceaux caractéristiques op. 8 (in Lepizig) and op. 16 (Paris). Later republished complete as op. 74. 
 
Étude in A minor (1840)
Jean qui pleure et Jean qui rit (1840)
 No. 1 Jean qui pleure in E minor
 No. 2 Jean qui rit in C major
Variations à la vielle in C major (1841)
Variations sur un air favori de l'opéra Ugo (1842)
Désir. Fantaisie pour piano in A major (1844)
Impromptu in F major, for piano (1845)
Appassionato in D major, sketch of op. 63, no. 29 (1847, unfinished)
 Ouverture de l'opéra 'Le prophète' de Meyerbeer arrangée pour piano (1850)
Les Regrets de la Nonnette. Petite mélodie pour piano in G minor (1854)
Palpitamento in A major (1855)
Etude alla Barbaro in F major, for piano (1857)
Petit conte pour le Piano in E major (1859)
Pour Monsieur Gurkhaus in G major (1863)
Zorcico. Danse Iberienne in D minor, for piano (1864)
Fantasticheria pour Piano in B minor (1868)
Chapeau bas! in F minor (1872)

Piano 4 hands
Finale (1840) (later published with the duplicate opus number op. 17)
 Fantaisie à 4 mains sur Don Juan in E minor–C major (1844) (later published with the duplicate opus number op.26)
 Ouverture de l'opéra 'Le prophète' de Meyerbeer arrangée pour piano à quatre mains. (1850).
 Saltarelle, Finale de la Sonate de Concert pour Piano et Violoncelle, arrangée à 4 mains (1866)

Organ
Pro Organo in C minor, for organ (1850)
Petits préludes sur les huit gammes du plain-chant, for organ (1859)

Organ or pédalier
12 Études d'orgue ou piano à pédalier pour les pieds seulement (12 Etudes for organ or pedal piano for the feet only) (1866)

Bombardo-Carillon in B major for pedal duet (four feet) (1872)

Pédalier
Etude, pour Piano à Clavier de Pedales in D major (1872) (ms., unfinished)

Vocal
Hermann et Ketty, for soprano, tenor and orchestra (1832) (ms., unpublished)
L'Entrée en loge, for tenor and orchestra (1834) (ms., unpublished)
, for two sopranos, tenor and bass without accompaniment in C major (1847)
Trois Anciennes Mélodies Juives (Three old Jewish melodies), for voice and piano (1854) (ms., unpublished).
 No. 1 Chant de Nouvel An in D minor
 No. 2 Consolation et espérance in A minor
 No. 3 Quand Israël sortit d'Égypte in F major
2er verset du 41me Psaume (42me de la Vulgate) (Verse 2 of the 41st Psalm (42nd of the Vulgate)), for voice and piano in E major (1855) (ms., unpublished)
Air tiré de J.S. Bach de la cantate 'Wie schön leuchtet der Morgenstern'  arr. soprano and piano in A major (1855) (ms., unpublished).
Halelouyoh, for soprano, contralto, tenor, bass and piano or organ in G minor (1857)
Stances de Millevoye, for three female voices and piano (1859)
Marcia funèbre, sulla morte d'un Pappagallo in C minor, for two sopranos, tenor, bass, three oboes and bassoon (1859)
Paix à la paix, hymn for solo voice in A major (1867) (ms., unpublished)

Other
Pas-redoublé in E major, for concert band (1840)
 Allegro agitato (A son confrère P: Cavallo), for string quartet in C minor (1846, 6 bars, unfinished ms.)

Lost works (without opus numbers)
 Allegretto and Finale of the Seventh Symphony of Beethoven, arr. for two pianos, eight hands (1838)
 Works for string quintet and string sextet (1840s)
 Symphony for large orchestra (1844–46) (Not the same as the Symphony for piano solo)
 Acte d'opéra (unperformed, mentioned  the press in 1846 and 1847)
 Romance du phare d'Eddystone for voice and piano (1847)
Cadenza for the first movement of a piano concerto of Handel (1869)
 1st Marche Militaire of Schubert (op. 51, D. 733), arr. for piano four hands (1877)
 Fiat lux, 1e. étude biblique pour orchestre, orchestral version and version arranged for piano (before 1881)

References
Notes

Sources
 François-Sappey, Brigitte and François Luguenot, (2013). Charles-Valentin Alkan, Paris: Bleu Nuit.

External links

Works by Charles-Valentin Alkan in MIDI files

Alkan, Charles-Valentin